The Air Transport Gendarmerie (GTA) is a branch of the French Gendarmerie placed under the dual supervision of the Gendarmerie and the Directorate General for Civil Aviation of the Transportation Ministry.  

It has a strength of about 1,100 and is commanded by a senior officer or by a general officer.  

Its missions are centered on airport security. It also carries out judicial inquiries pertaining to civilian aviation accidents.  

The GTA was created in 1953 out of existing airport gendarmerie specialist units created from 1946. 

The Air Transport Gendarmerie should not be confused with the smaller Air Gendarmerie, which provides policing for the French Air Force.

Missions
The GTA's diverse missions include:

 police and security in civilian airfields and airports
 counter-terrorism
 counter-narcotic activities
 freight surveillance
 surveillance of technical installations of the airports (control towers etc.)
 traffic control on the roads within the airports
 protection of important visitors stopping for a layover
 judicial inquiries pertaining to accidents of civilian aircraft

Personnel of the GTA cover a wide range of specialities, including security patrols, freight inspectors, counter-snipers, aviators, dog handlers, auditors, and health inspectors. All personnel follow an initial aviation-related course called .

Units
The GTA headquarters are in Paris. The GTA is divided into two metropolitan groupings and the overseas units.

The different companies cover more airports than just the airport in their name. For example the Paris-Orly Company also covers Issy-les-Moulineaux, Beauvais-Tillé, Lille-Lesquin, Toussus-le-Noble & CRNA Nord Athis-Mons, the Strasbourg Company also covers Bâle-Mulhouse, Metz-Nancy-Lorraine et CRNA Est Reims, and the Bordeaux Company also covers Biarritz-Anglet-Bayonne and Pau.

Northern Grouping 
The Northern Grouping is headquartered at Paris-Charles-de-Gaulle airport. It contains the Paris-Charles-de-Gaulle company, the Paris-Orly Company, the Brest Company, and the Strasbourg Company.

Southern Grouping
The Southern Grouping is headquartered in Aix-en-Provence. It contains the Lyons Company, the Bordeaux Company, the Marseilles Company, the Nice Company, and the Toulouse Company.

Overseas Air Transport Gendarmerie
Seven small brigades (typically of ten to twelve gendarmes each) cover overseas installations. Together these are known as the "Overseas Air Transport Gendarmerie":
Brigade de Cayenne-Félix Éboué (Guyane)
Brigade de Nouméa-La Tontouta (Nouvelle-Calédonie)
Brigade du Lamentin (Martinique)
Brigade de Guadeloupe
Brigade de Saint-Denis (La Réunion)
Brigade de Tahiti-Faaa (Polynésie française)
Brigade de Aéroport de Dzaoudzi-Pamandzi (Mayotte)

References

French Gendarmerie
Airport law enforcement agencies